Novegradian language (nov. Новеградескей лизике) – constructed language based on Old Novgorod dialect.

The grammar of Novegradian language was created by author under pseudonym of Martin Posthumus.

See also
 Novgorod Republic
 North Slavic languages
 Pomor dialects
 Interslavic

References

External links
 Grammar of the Novegradian Language

Constructed languages